The 2023 Jigawa State gubernatorial election will take place on 18 March 2023, to elect the Governor of Jigawa State, concurrent with elections to the Jigawa State House of Assembly as well as twenty-seven other gubernatorial elections and elections to all other state houses of assembly. The election—which was postponed from its original 11 March date—will be held three weeks after the presidential election and National Assembly elections. Incumbent APC Governor Mohammed Badaru Abubakar is term-limited and cannot seek re-election to a third term.

Party primaries were scheduled for between 4 April and 9 June 2022 with the Peoples Democratic Party nominating Mustapha Sule Lamido—businessman and son of former Governor Sule Lamido—on 25 May while the All Progressives Congress nominated Deputy Governor Umar Namadi on 26 May and the smaller New Nigeria Peoples Party nominated former commissioner Aminu Ibrahim Ringim unopposed on 6 June.

Electoral system
The Governor of Jigawa State is elected using a modified two-round system. To be elected in the first round, a candidate must receive the plurality of the vote and over 25% of the vote in at least two-thirds of state local government areas. If no candidate passes this threshold, a second round will be held between the top candidate and the next candidate to have received a plurality of votes in the highest number of local government areas.

Background
Jigawa State is a northwestern state mainly inhabited by ethnic Hausas and Fulanis. It has a growing economy but is facing an underdeveloped agricultural sector, desertification, and low education rates.

Politically, the 2019 elections confirmed the state's status as one of the most staunchly APC states in the nation as both Buhari and Abubakar won the state by wide margins and every single legislative seat on the senatorial, House of Representatives, and House of Assembly levels were carried by APC nominees. At the beginning of his term, Abubakar said his administration would focus on youth empowerment, human development, and social services. In terms of his performance, Abubakar was praised for his financial prudence but was criticized for frequent absences from Dutse and a lack of government transparency along with going on vacation amid deadly floods in September 2022.

Primary elections
The primaries, along with any potential challenges to primary results, were to take place between 4 April and 3 June 2022 but the deadline was extended to 9 June. According to some groups from the state's northeastern senatorial district, an informal zoning gentlemen's agreement sets the North-East to produce the next governor as since the state's creation in 1991, all Jigawa governors have come from either the South-West or North-West senatorial districts. While none of the major parties formally zoned their nominations, the APC nominated a northeasterner while the NNPP and PDP did not.

All Progressives Congress 

The night before the primary, Governor Mohammed Badaru Abubakar asked candidates to pick a consensus candidate amongst themselves but the aspirants rejected his request. The next day, nine candidates continued to an indirect primary in Kazaure that ended with Umar Namadi—Deputy Governor and former Commissioner for Finance—emerging as the APC nominee after results showed Namadi winning over 85% of the delegates' votes. In his acceptance speech, Namadi thanked Abubakar before extending an olive branch to his former opponents. After the primary, Abubakar formed a party reconciliation committee in an attempt to stave off potential defections. In June, Namadi's running mate was announced as Aminu Usman—a serving commissioner. Despite the reconciliation attempts, former aspirant Farouk Adamu Aliyu challenged the primary results in court; in September, his suit was dismissed by a Federal High Court. By January, the court battle had reached the Supreme Court which ruled in favor of Namadi on 13 January.

Nominated 
 Umar Namadi: Deputy Governor (2019–present) and Commissioner for Finance (2015–2019)
Running mate—Aminu Usman: Commissioner for Works and Transport

Eliminated in primary 
 Farouk Adamu Aliyu: former House of Representatives member for Buji/Birnin Kudu (2003–2007) and former House of Representatives Minority Leader
 Aminu Kani: businessman
 Ibrahim Hassan Hadejia: Senator for Jigawa North (2019–present), former Deputy Governor (2003–2007; 2015–2019), Secretary to the State Government (2001–2003), and state Attorney-General (1999–2001)
 Sani Hussaini Garin Gabas: former state Attorney-General
 Ahmad Mahmoud: former Deputy Governor (2007–2015)
 Abba Muktar
 Mohammed Sabo Nakudu: Senator for Jigawa South-West (2015–present) and former House of Representatives member for Buji/Birnin Kudu (2007–2015)
 Ahmed Zakari: former aide to President Muhammadu Buhari and son of former acting Independent National Electoral Commission Chairwomen Amina Zakari

Declined 
 Danladi Abdullahi Sankara: Senator for Jigawa North-West (2015–present) and former House of Representatives member for Gagarawa/Gumel/Maigatari/Sule Tankarkar (1999–2003)
 Suleiman Adamu Kazaure: Minister of Water Resources (2015–present)
 Muhammed Babandede: former Comptroller-General of the Nigeria Immigration Service (2016–2021)

Results

New Nigeria Peoples Party 
The national NNPP announced its primary schedule on 12 April 2022, setting its expression of interest form price at ₦1 million and the nomination form price at ₦10 million with forms being sold from 10 April to 5 May. The rest of the timetable was revised on 19 May; after the purchase and submission of forms, gubernatorial candidates are to be screened by a party committee on 28 May while the screening appeal process is slated for the next day. Ward congresses are set for 22 April to elect delegates for the primary. Candidates approved by the screening process will advance to a primary set for 30 May, in concurrence with all other NNPP gubernatorial primaries; challenges to the result can be made the next day. The primary date was again shifted, to 6 June.

In early 2022, Aminu Ibrahim Ringim (a former state cabinet official who was the PDP gubernatorial nominee in 2015 and 2019) and many of his allies defected from the PDP to join the NNPP amid a surge in NNPP ranks after former Kano State Governor Rabiu Musa Kwankwaso joined the party. On the primary date, Ibrahim Ringim won unopposed. In July, the party's deputy gubernatorial nominee was announced as Abdulaziz Usman—a former Senator.

Nominated
 Aminu Ibrahim Ringim: 2015 and 2019 PDP gubernatorial nominee, former Chief of Staff to Governor Sule Lamido, Commissioner of Agriculture, former House of Representatives member
Running mate—Abdulaziz Usman: former Senator for Jigawa North-East (2007–2015) and former House of Representatives member (1999–2007)

Results

People’s Democratic Party 

On the date of the primary, former MHR Bashir Adamu withdrew from the race but pledged his support to whichever candidate was nominated by the party. When vote collation was completed later that day, Mustapha Sule Lamido emerged victorious with 829 votes to 0 votes for his opponent Saleh Shehu Hadejia; three votes were invalid. On 11 June, Lamido picked state PDP Chairman Babandi Ibrahim Gumel as his running mate.

Nominated 
 Mustapha Sule Lamido: 2019 PDP Jigawa South-West senatorial nominee and son of former Governor Sule Lamido
 Running mate: Babandi Ibrahim Gumel

Eliminated in primary 
 Saleh Shehu Hadejia: former Minister of State for Works

Withdrew 
 Bashir Adamu: 2019 SDP gubernatorial nominee and former House of Representatives member for Kazaure/Roni/Gwiwa/Yankwashi (1999–2015)

Declined 
 Nuruddeen Muhammad: 2015 PDP deputy gubernatorial nominee and former Minister of State for Foreign Affairs (2011–2015)

Results

Minor parties 

 Binta Yahaya Umar (Action Alliance)
Running mate: Naziru Inuwa
 Sulaiman Yusuf Ibrahim (Action Democratic Party)
Running mate: Wada Ibrahim
 Sani Muhammad (African Democratic Congress)
Running mate: Auto Habiba Ibrahim
 Ahmed Yero (All Progressives Grand Alliance)
Running mate: Mohammed Hassan
 Abdullahi Tsoho Garba (Labour Party)
Running mate: Sule Yakubu
 Hassan Ibrahim Aminu (National Rescue Movement)
Running mate: Shitu Abdu
 Ahmed Adamu Kaugama (People's Redemption Party)
Running mate: Lawan Wurno Ma'awi
 Ahmed Bello Ibrahim (Social Democratic Party)
Running mate: Adamu Habuna Umar
 Suleiman Abdullahi (Young Progressives Party)
Running mate: Maryam Murtala

Campaign
After the primaries, pundits noted the contrast between Namadi, who was hand-picked by outgoing Governor Mohammed Badaru Abubakar, and Lamido—who was backed by his father, former Governor Sule Lamido. For Namadi, observers focused on the inability for incumbent Jigawa governors to get their hand-picked successors to succeed them while Lamido's lack of governing experience was also mentioned. Thus the race was framed as a potential enthronement of Abubakar as a political godfather if Namadi won or the entrenchment of a political dynasty if Lamido won.

By 2023, attention largely switched to the presidential election on 25 February. In the election, Jigawa State narrowly voted for Bola Tinubu (APC); Tinubu won 45.8% of the vote, beating the 42.0% of Atiku Abubakar (PDP) and the 10.7% of Rabiu Kwankwaso (NNPP). Although the close result was unsurprising as projections had noted a close race, the totals led to increased attention on the gubernatorial race as it was a much slimmer APC margin of victory than in recent previous elections. Gubernatorial campaign analysis from after the presidential election noted the role of the Lamido family in the state PDP's renewal while observing increasingly tense regional dynamics between emirate communities. Pundits also observed that the boost of APC incumbency had been counteracted by largescale internal disunity in the state APC. Nevertheless, the EiE-SBM forecast projected Namadi to win based on the state's "settled" political dynamics.

Projections

Conduct

Electoral timetable

General election

Results

By senatorial district 
The results of the election by senatorial district.

By federal constituency
The results of the election by federal constituency.

By local government area 
The results of the election by local government area.

See also 
 2023 Nigerian elections
 2023 Nigerian gubernatorial elections

Notes

References 

Jigawa State gubernatorial election
2023
2023 Jigawa State elections
Jigawa